Sutton-in-Ashfield is a market town in the Ashfield district of Nottinghamshire, England.  The town and its surrounding area contain 13 listed buildings that are recorded in the National Heritage List for England.  Of these, one is listed at Grade II*, the middle of the three grades, and the others are at Grade II, the lowest grade.  The listed buildings consist of two churches, a headstone in a churchyard, houses, a public house, a former cotton mill and associated structures, and three war memorials.


Key

Buildings

References

Citations

Sources

 

Lists of listed buildings in Nottinghamshire
Listed